Skorradalshreppur is a municipality in Iceland.

References

Municipalities of Iceland